Glyptoscelis prosopis is a species of leaf beetle. Its range spans from southern Texas to Mexico and Central America. It was first described by the American entomologist Charles Frederic August Schaeffer in 1905.

References

Further reading

 

Eumolpinae
Articles created by Qbugbot
Beetles described in 1905
Beetles of North America
Taxa named by Charles Frederic August Schaeffer